Wu Nanxuan (1893–1980), was a Chinese educator and psychologist, best known for his president positions of several prestigious Chinese universities.

Biography
Wu's original name was Wu Mian, and was born in Yizheng, Jiangsu Province in 1893. Wu finished his high school education in Yangzhou. In 1919, Wu graduated from Fudan University Preparatory School in Shanghai, and left to the United States to continue his study. Wu obtained MA in 1923 and PhD in 1929 both from the University of California, Berkeley.

From April 1931 to June 1931, Wu was the President of Tsinghua University in Beijing, but eventually expelled by his students and the university faculty. From May 1940 to February 1943, Wu was the President of Fudan University in Shanghai. In February 1943, Wu was pointed the President of National Yingshi University (a root of current Zhejiang University) in Zhejiang, however, Wu was immediately resigned but still kept his professorship at Fudan University.

In 1949, Wu went to Taiwan. In 1966, Wu became the Dean of the School of Humanities of the National Chengchi University in Taipei.

References

External links
 清华历史上的校长更迭风波 (Tsinghua University presidents alternation incident)
 复旦的传统 (The Tradition of Fudan University)
 National Tsinghua University Archive: 北京清華時期歷任校長一覽表 (List of Tsinghua Presidents during the Beijing period)
 Hudong.com: Biography of Wu Nanxuan

Fudan University alumni
Academic staff of Tsinghua University
University of California, Berkeley alumni
Educators from Yangzhou
Chinese psychologists
1893 births
1980 deaths
Academic staff of Fudan University
Academic staff of the National Chengchi University
20th-century psychologists
Chinese expatriates in the United States